The Graduate may refer to:

 The Graduate, a 1967 comedy-drama-romance movie
 The Graduate (novel), a novel by Charles Webb that the movie was based on
 The Graduate (soundtrack), the soundtrack to the 1967 movie featuring songs by Simon & Garfunkel
 The Graduate (2013 film), a South Korean film
 The Graduate (MC Lars album), the fifth studio album of MC Lars
 The Graduate (Nerina Pallot album), the third studio album of Nerina Pallot
 The Graduate (band), an American rock band
 Graduate level, an alternative name for postgraduate education

See also
 Graduate (disambiguation)
 The Graduates (disambiguation)